The Joint Information Operations Warfare Center (JIOWC) supports the CJCS, Joint Staff, and the Joint Force in improving the ability of the United States Department of Defense to conduct military operations in the Information Environment (OIE). They also work towards improving the development of information-related capabilities, and ensuring operational integration and coherence across combatant commands, and other Department of Defense activities.

History 
On 1 October 2011, the JIOWC was chartered as a Chairman's Controlled Activity aligned under the Joint Staff. The JIOWC Director reports to Joint Staff J3, through the Deputy Director Global Operations, J39 (DDGO).

References

 

Centers of the U.S. Department of Defense
Information operations and warfare